Hoopers Shoulder is an independent cone at an elevation of  on the western slopes of Mount Erebus on Ross Island, Antarctica. From McMurdo Sound it appears as a perfect pyramid of black rock, standing out as a splendid mark against the background of the ice and almost on a line from Cape Royds to the crater of Mount Erebus. It was named by Frank Debenham on the second ascent of Mount Erebus for F.J. Hooper, a steward of the British Antarctic Expedition, 1910–13, and a member of the ascent party.

References

Volcanoes of Ross Island